Acausal, as an adjective, may refer to:

 In Jungian psychology, a synonym of synchronistic, i.e., related by meaning rather than causation
 Anticausal system, in engineering, a system or filter whose output at time T depends partly on its input for some later time T+n